La Barben is a commune in the Bouches-du-Rhône department in the Provence-Alpes-Côte d'Azur region of southern France.

The inhabitants of the commune are known as Barbenais or Barbenaises.

The town is perhaps best known for its castle and its zoo.

Geography
La Barben is located about 18 km northwest of Aix-en-Provence and 5 km east of Salon-de-Provence. Access to the commune is by the D572 road from Salon-de-Provence, which passes through the centre of the commune and continues east to Saint-Cannat. The D17 from Pélissanne to Éguilles forms the southwestern border of the commune. The D67E from Lambesc to Coudoux forms the southeastern border of the commune. The D22A comes from Pelissane and passes through the village, continuing as the D22 to join the D572 in the centre of the commune next to the zoo.

The commune is served by routes 9 and 14 of the Libébus network.

The Touloubre river flows through the centre of the commune from the east and continues west to join the Mediterranean Sea south of Saint-Chamas. The Vallat de Boulery forms the northern border of the commune as it flows west to join the Touloubre at the village. The Canal de Marseille comes from the south and passes through the centre of the commune continuing north-east.

Climate

Weather Data for La Barben

Neighbouring communes and villages

History

Middle Ages
The death of Queen Joanna I of Naples created a succession crisis for the County of Provence with the cities of the Union of Aix (1382-1387) supporting Charles III of Naples against Louis I, Duke of Anjou. The King of France, Charles VI, intervened and sent the Seneschal of Beaucaire, Enguerrand d'Eudin, who conquered La Barben in the summer of 1383. When Louis I died and his widow, Marie of Blois, Duchess of Anjou, arrived in Provence to defend the rights of her son, Louis II of Naples, she claimed that the seneschal gave her the city which she refused on the instruction of the King of France.

Heraldry

Administration

List of Successive Mayors

Demography
In 2017 the commune had 845 inhabitants.

Culture and heritage

Civil heritage
The commune has many buildings and sites that are registered as historical monuments:
A Laundry at La Blancherie (18th century)
A Chateau Garden on the D22 (17th century)
A Bridge over the Canal de Marseille on RN572 (19th century)
A Montjoie at La Baou
The fortified Chateau de la Barben (11th century)
A Farmhouse at La Baou (18th century)
The Clos Farmhouse at Sufferchoix (15th century)
A Farmhouse at Val d'Estable (18th century)

Other sites of interest
The La Barben Zoo

Zoo Picture Gallery

Religious heritage
The commune has several religious buildings and structures that are registered as historical monuments:
The Parish Church of Saint-Sauveur The Church contains several items that are registered as historical objects:
2 Chairs (19th century)
A Statue: Virgin and child (18th century)
A framed Painting: the Transfiguration (1632)
A Painting: Saint Jerome (17th century)
The Benedictine Church of Saint-Sauveur (11th century)
The Benedictine Convent of Saint-Victor-de-Danes at Le Mounestier (12th century)
A Monumental Cross at Val d'Estable (17th century)
A Monumental Cross at La Beaumé de Matelas (19th century)

Notable people linked to the commune
Count Auguste de Forbin (1777-1841), painter, pupil of Jacques-Louis David, Director of the Louvre Museum.

See also
Communes of the Bouches-du-Rhône department

References

Notes

External links
La Barben on the old National Geographic Institute website 
Regional Directorate of the Environment (DIREN) website 
La Barben on Géoportail, National Geographic Institute (IGN) website 
La Barben on the 1750 Cassini Map

Communes of Bouches-du-Rhône